Graham Rowley (born 12 May 1940) is a former Australian racing cyclist. He won the Australian national road race title in 1974.

References

External links

1940 births
Living people
Australian male cyclists
Cyclists from Victoria (Australia)
People from Traralgon